FK Rīga was a Latvian football club based in Riga. They played in the Virslīga, the top division in Latvian football. They played their home games at Latvijas Universitātes Stadions. In 1999, its first year of existence, the club won the Latvian Cup, beating Skonto at the final. The club also played in the UEFA Cup. In 2007, FK Rīga achieved its best result in Virslīga so far by finishing 3rd as the highest placed club from Riga.

FK Rīga played in the 2008 Intertoto Cup. Their first round opponents were Fylkir from suburban Árbær in the eastern part of Reykjavík. In the second round. they played Irish club Bohemian and, as against Fylkir, the home leg was played in the city of Liepāja, approximately 217 kilometres from Riga.

At the end of the 2007–08 season the club went bankrupt due to its financial problems and the football school, that was in the club's system, joined FK Olimps/ASK (later known as RFS/Olimps).

Honours
Latvian Cup: (1)
1999

League results

European performances
1Q = First Qualifying Round
1R = First Round

Managers
 Jānis Gilis (1999)
 Georgijs Gusarenko (2000–2001)
 Viktors Ņesterenko (2001–2002)
 Aleksandrs Dorofejevs (2002)
 Georgijs Gusarenko (2002)
 Viktors Ņesterenko (2002–2003)
 Paul Ashworth (2004)
 Ēriks Grigjans (2005–2006)
 Sergejs Semjonovs (2006–2007)
 Genādijs Morozovs (2008)
 Anatolijs Šeļests (2008)

External links
Official website

 
Riga
Riga
Association football clubs disestablished in 2008
1999 establishments in Latvia
2008 disestablishments in Latvia